On June 1, 1998, President Bill Clinton issued a Memorandum on Plain Language in Government Writing. (PDF) The rationale for this memorandum was to "make the Government more responsive, accessible, and understandable in its communications with the public" and its goal is to save the Government and the private sector "time, effort and money." Accompanying guidance was issued at the time the memorandum entered the record.

Signed into law on October 13, 2010, by President Obama, the Plain Writing Act of 2010 is a United States federal law that requires that federal executive agencies:
 Use plain writing in every covered document that the agency issues or substantially revises
 Train employees in "plain writing"
 Establish a process for overseeing the agency's compliance with this Act
 Create and maintain a plain writing section on the agency's website to inform the public of agency compliance with the requirements of this Act
 Provide a mechanism for the agency to receive and respond to public input on agency implementation and agency reports required under this Act, and be accessible from its homepage
 Designate one or more agency points-of-contact to receive and respond to public input on the implementation of this Act

Example

Before: 
The amount of expenses reimbursed to a claimant under this subpart shall be reduced by any amount that the claimant receives from a collateral source. In cases in which a claimant receives reimbursement under this subpart for expenses that also will or may be reimbursed from another source, the claimant shall subrogate the United States to the claim for payment from the collateral source up to the amount for which the claimant was reimbursed under this subpart.
After: 
If you get a payment from a collateral source, we will reduce our payment by the amount you get. If you get payments from us and from a collateral source for the same expenses, you must pay us back the amount we paid you.

See also
 Paperwork Reduction Act

References

External links
 PlainLanguage.gov
 2018 Report Card by the independent Center for Plain Language, for each federal department

United States federal government administration legislation
Plain English
Acts of the 111th United States Congress